Daniel Nikolac (born 11 May 1961) is a Venezuelan footballer. He played in five matches for the Venezuela national football team from 1985 to 1989. He was also part of Venezuela's squad for the 1983 Copa América tournament.

References

External links
 

1961 births
Living people
Venezuelan footballers
Venezuela international footballers
Place of birth missing (living people)
Association football goalkeepers